Gregory Snegoff (born June 22, 1955) is an American voice actor, writer and dialogue director who frequently works on English-language anime dubs. He is also known by the names Greg Snegoff, Gregory Snow, and Greg Snow.

Early life 
Snegoff is a native of Santa Monica, California. He is the son of the make-up artist Marc Snegoff and the voice actress Alexandra Kenworthy, and brother of the stuntman Tony Snegoff.

Career 
He is known for providing the voices of Khyron and Scott Bernard in Robotech, Professor Kusakabe and Additional voices in My Neighbor Totoro, Taki Renzaburo in Wicked City, Maltravers in The Legend of the Titanic, Fritz / Geoffrey in Titanic: The Legend Goes On, Smile in Tentacolino, and Fukuo and Additional voices in Kiki's Delivery Service, and the title character of Cocco Bill.

Personal life 
Snegoff was married to fellow voice actor Lisa Michelson until her death in 1991. Since 1995, Snegoff has been married to Fiorella Capuano.

Filmography

Film

Television

Video games

References

External links

1955 births
Living people
Male actors from Santa Monica, California
American male voice actors
American people of Russian-Jewish descent
American voice directors
American expatriates in Italy